Steel City is a 2006 American drama film written and directed by Brian Jun and starring John Heard, Tom Guiry and America Ferrera.

Cast
 John Heard as Carl Lee
 Tom Guiry as P.J. Lee
 America Ferrera as Amy Barnes
 Clayne Crawford as Ben Lee
 Laurie Metcalf as Marianne Karn
 Raymond J. Barry as Vic Lee

Reception
The film has an 83% rating on Rotten Tomatoes.  Time Out gave it four stars out of five.  Owen Gleiberman of Entertainment Weekly graded the film a B+.

References

External links
 
 

American drama films
2000s English-language films
2000s American films